The Society of Canadian Ornithologists, or Société des Ornithologistes du Canada, is an ornithological non-profit organization serving Canada’s ornithological community.  It was founded in 1983, and is a member of the Ornithological Council.

The goals of the Society are to encourage and support research towards the understanding and conservation of Canadian birds, serve as a professional society for both amateur and professional Canadian ornithologists, represent Canadian ornithologists within professional ornithological societies, publish information about Canadian birds, and recognise excellence in research, conservation and mentorship in the Canadian ornithological community.

Publications and awards 

The Society produces the journal Avian Conservation and Ecology (French: Écologie et Conservation des Oiseaux), which is published jointly with Birds Canada, as well as a newsletter, Picoides.  It makes two annual awards, the Doris Huestis Speirs Award, which is given for outstanding lifetime contributions to Canadian ornithology, and the Jamie Smith Memorial Mentoring Award.

Annual Meeting

See also
 Open access in Canada

References
 Society of Canadian Ornithologists

Environmental organizations based in Canada
Ornithological organizations
1983 establishments in Canada